Thidapa "Jasmine" Suwannapura (born 20 November 1992) is a Thai professional golfer. 

A Ramkhamhaeng University graduate, she qualified for the Honda LPGA Thailand as an amateur in 2006, 2008 and 2010. She is the winner of the 2008 Hong Kong Ladies Amateur, the 2008 Singha Pattaya Open, the 2009 Srixon Junior International by Jack Newton, in Australia, and also won the 2010 Malaysia Amateur Open, the 2010 Honda Junior Masters, and the 2010 Riverwoods Junior Championship, in the Netherlands. 

She turned professional in 2011. Suwannapura finished 8th at the ISPS Handa Women's Australian Open in the 2013 season and won the Hero Women's Indian Open in November 2013 by three strokes, winning $45,000. On the 2013 LPGA Tour she made 14 cuts out of 21 events.

Amateur wins
2008 Singha Pattaya Open, Hong Kong Ladies Amateur
2009 Srixon Junior International
2010 Malaysia Amateur Open, Honda Junior Masters, Riverwoods Junior Championship

Professional wins (10)

LPGA Tour wins (2)

LPGA Tour playoff record (1–0)

Ladies European Tour wins (1)

^ Co-sanctioned by the Ladies Asian Golf Tour.

Symetra Tour wins (1)
2012 Vidalia Championship

All Thailand Golf Tour wins (5)
2008 Singha Pattaya Open (as an amateur)
2010 Singha Masters (as an amateur)
2011 Singha Pattaya Open, Singha Masters (2012 calendar year)
2013 Singha Masters

Thai LPGA Tour wins (1) 
2010 (1) 2nd SAT-Thai LPGA Championship (as an amateur)

Results in LPGA majors
Results not in chronological order before 2019 or in 2020.

CUT = missed the half-way cut
WD = withdrew
NT = no tournament
T = tied

Team appearances
Amateur
Southeast Asian Games (representing Thailand): 2009

Professional
Amata Friendship Cup (representing Thailand): 2018 (winners)

References

External links

Thidapa Suwannapura
LPGA Tour golfers
Ladies European Tour golfers
Golfers at the 2010 Asian Games
Thidapa Suwannapura
Southeast Asian Games medalists in golf
Thidapa Suwannapura
Competitors at the 1999 Southeast Asian Games
Thidapa Suwannapura
Thidapa Suwannapura
1992 births
Living people
Thidapa Suwannapura
Thidapa Suwannapura